Kal Bhairab is a village development committee in Dailekh District in the Bheri Zone of western-central Nepal. At the time of the 1991 Nepal census it had a population of 3787 people living in 713 individual households.

In Kal Bhairab there are two villages: Bhukahan and Toryan. In Bhukahan, Bhatu, Bhairabthan, Rumalthan, Amaldharaghara, Baradanda, and Okhaldhunga are famous places. In Torayan, Palta and Lamagada are famous places.

References

External links
UN map of the municipalities of Dailekh District

Populated places in Dailekh District